The Almaden Times is a community newspaper that serves Almaden Valley, California and the surrounding south Santa Clara County, California.  It is owned by Times Media, Inc., which also publishes the Evergreen Times and the Willow Glen Times. The current Publisher of the Almaden Times is William Bellou. The monthly circulation of the Almaden Times is 14,500. Archived digital copies of the Almaden Times are available online.

History 
Publication of The Almaden Times began in 1986.

In 2004, the weekly Almaden Resident began competing with the Almaden Times in the South San Jose region.

Awards
In 2013, the Almaden Times and other community papers published by Times Media Inc. received a commendation from San Jose's mayor Reed for 30 years of dedicated community coverage.

References 

Newspapers published in San Jose, California